Dhi Bin District is a district of the 'Amran Governorate, Yemen. As of 2003, the district had a population of 30,799 inhabitants.

See also
Dhi Bin

References

Districts of 'Amran Governorate
Dhi Bin District